Fishery Falls may refer to:

 Fishery Falls, Queensland, a locality in the Cairns Region, Queensland, Australia
 Fishery Falls (Queensland), a waterfall in the Wooroonooran locality, adjacent to the locality Fishery Falls, Queensland